Tephroite is the manganese endmember of the olivine group of nesosilicate  minerals with the formula Mn2SiO4.  A solid solution series exists between tephroite and its analogues, the  group endmembers fayalite and forsterite. Divalent iron or magnesium may readily replace manganese in the olivine crystal structure.

It was first described for an occurrence at the Sterling Hill Mine and Franklin, New Jersey, United States. It occurs in iron-manganese ore deposits and their related skarns. It also occurs in metamorphosed manganese-rich sediments. It occurs in association with: zincite, willemite, franklinite, rhodonite, jacobsite, diopside, gageite, bustamite, manganocalcite, glaucochroite, calcite, banalsite and alleghanyite. It can also be found in England and Sweden.

Tephroite has a hardness of 6 and a specific gravity of approximately 4.1, which is heavy for non-metallic minerals. Its name comes from the Greek tephros, "ash gray", for its color. It can also be found olive-green, greenish-blue, pink, or brown. Other names for tephroite include mangan olivine and mangan peridot.

References

Mineral galleries

Manganese(II) minerals
Nesosilicates
Orthorhombic minerals
Minerals in space group 62